The men's foil was one of seven fencing events on the fencing at the 1948 Summer Olympics programme. It was the tenth appearance of the event. The competition was held from 3 August 1948 to 4 August 1948. 63 fencers from 25 nations competed. The event was won by Jehan Buhan of France, the nation's first victory in the men's foil since 1928 and fifth overall (passing Italy for most all-time). His countryman Christian d'Oriola took silver, while Lajos Maszlay earned Hungary's first medal in the men's individual foil with his bronze.

Background
This was the 10th appearance of the event, which has been held at every Summer Olympics except 1908 (when there was a foil display only rather than a medal event). None of the pre-World War II 1936 finalists returned. The favorite was young Christian d'Oriola, the 1947 world champion. Joining him on the French team was 1947 épée world champion Jehan Buhan, who would have been favored in 1940 were it not for the war.

Colombia, Ireland, Luxembourg, and Turkey each made their debut in the men's foil. The United States made its ninth appearance, most of any nation, having missed only the inaugural 1896 competition.

Competition format

The event used a four-round format. In each round, the fencers were divided into pools to play a round-robin within the pool. Bouts were to five touches. Not all bouts were played in some pools if not necessary to determine advancement. Ties were broken through fence-off bouts ("barrages") in early rounds if necessary for determining advancement, but by touches received in final rounds (and for non-advancement-necessary placing in earlier rounds). Standard foil rules were used, including that touches had to be made with the tip of the foil, the target area was limited to the torso, and priority determined the winner of double touches.
 Round 1: There were 8 pools of 7–9 fencers each. The top 4 fencers in each pool advanced to the quarterfinals.
 Quarterfinals: There were 4 pools of 8 fencers each. The top 4 fencers in each quarterfinal advanced to the semifinals.
 Semifinals: There were 2 pools of 8 fencers each. The top 4 fencers in each semifinal advanced to the final.
 Final: The final pool had 8 fencers.

Schedule

All times are British Summer Time (UTC+1)

Results

Round 1

The top 4 finishers in each pool advanced to round 2.

Pool 1

Hörning defeated Gretsch in a barrage for fourth place.

Pool 2

Younes and Rydström defeated Barrientos in a three-way barrage for third and fourth place.

Pool 3

Palócz defeated Albrechtsen in a barrage for fourth place.

Pool 4

Pool 5

Pool 6

Pool 7

Abdel Hafeez defeated Lamesch in a barrage for fourth place.

Pool 8

Schlaepfer defeated Hátszeghy in a barrage for fourth place.

Quarterfinals

The top 4 finishers in each pool advanced to the semifinals.

Quarterfinal 1

Quarterfinal 2

Quarterfinal 3

Quarterfinal 4

Semifinals

The top 4 finishers in each pool advanced to the final.

Semifinal 1

Semifinal 2

Di Rosa defeated Cetrulo in a barrage for fourth place.

Final

References

Foil men
Men's events at the 1948 Summer Olympics